Health care reform measures in Germany are designated by the legislature for the organization of the health care system. The main aim of such reforms is to curb the increase of costs in statutory health insurance (for example, by stabilizing the contribution rate and, thus, non-wage labor costs by reducing benefits, increasing co-payments or by changing the remuneration of service providers). Earlier reforms resulted in the inclusion of bigger communities in social security.

Most health reforms should cause a short term change in the financing of medical achievements. The prevention of disease-conditional expenses was not emphasized by previous health reforms. The notion of health reform emerged only since the introduction of the health reform law in 1989.

References

2007 in politics
2003 in politics
Reform in Germany